Crunkcore (also known as crunk punk and scrunk) is a musical fusion genre characterized by the combination of musical elements from crunk, post-hardcore, heavy metal, pop, electronic and dance music. The genre often features screamed vocals, hip hop beats, and sexually provocative lyrics. The genre developed from members of the scene subculture during the mid 2000s.

History and characteristics
According to MasterClass, crunkcore originated by fusing "post-hardcore punk and hip hop into an aggressive, party-hearty sound in the mid-2000s." The genre took influence from various subgenres related to post-hardcore (screamo and emo) and heavy metal (metalcore and nu metal). Other genres to influence crunkcore acts include rap rock, electropop, dance-pop, techno, and funk. Writer and musician Jessica Hopper claims that Panic! at the Disco's fusion of emo and electronic elements influenced the development of crunkcore in the mid-2000s. While crunkcore is typically characterized by the use of screamed vocals, some crunkcore artists do not scream. For instance, Warped Tour co-creator and CEO Kevin Lyman calls the group 3OH!3 "the real tipping point for scrunk", and said that "though 3OH!3 doesn't incorporate the blood-curdling screams of many scrunk acts, they were the first emo-influenced act to depart from traditional instruments in favor of pre-programmed beats", while still retaining many of the stylistic elements of emo. The Millionaires, who do not use screamed vocals, are also crunkcore.

The Phoenix described crunkcore as "a combination of minimalist Southern hip-hop, auto-tune croons, techno breakdowns, barked vocals, and party-till-you-puke poetics". Inland Empire Magazine described the genre as combining " and heavy metal licks with crunk."

Culture and criticism
The Boston Phoenix has mentioned criticism of the style, saying that "the idea that a handful of kids would remix lowest-common-denominator screamo with crunk beats, misappropriated gangsterisms, and the extreme garishness of emo fashion was sure to incite hate-filled diatribes". Amy Sciarretto of Noisecreep noted that crunkcore is "oft maligned as the nu metal of this generation." The group Brokencyde in particular has been singled out, with John McDonnell of The Guardian reviewing their music unfavorably. AbsolutePunk founder Jason Tate said that the level of backlash against Brokencyde is more than he has seen for any single act in the ten years. According to Tate, "they're just that bad, and they epitomize everything that music (and human beings) should not be." Brokencyde member Mikl has acknowledged the criticism leveled at them, but stated, "We don't care what people say ... All these critics are trying to bring us down, and yet we're selling a lot of copies of our music and that's because of our dedicated fans." Writer Jessica Hopper also has criticized the group, but acknowledged its appeal to teenagers, stating "brokeNCYDE just completely references anything that might be a contemporary pop culture reference, or anything that a teenage person is into.... You kind of get everything at once." 3OH!3 drew similar controversy in 2015 by releasing a single titled "My Dick".

References

21st-century music genres
Fusion music genres
Crunk
Post-hardcore
2000s in music
2010s in music
Electronic music genres
Electropop
Hip hop genres